Robert Dennis Chantrell (Newington, Surrey 14 January 1793 – Norwood, 4 January 1872) was an English church architect, best-known today for designing Leeds Parish Church, now Leeds Minster.

Early life 
Chantrell was born in Newington, Southwark, London. His father, Robert (1765-1840) had interests in a range of businesses that took the family to Europe, settling in Bruges in 1808. He was a pupil in the office of Sir John Soane from 1807 to 1814, where he learnt the principles of Classical architecture. In 1816, Chantrell moved to Halifax where he assisted the architect William Bradley. In  March 1819, Chantrell won the competition to build the Leeds Public Baths and he opened a practice in Leeds.

Career 
At the beginning of his career Chantrell designed a string of classical buildings. The Public Baths were single storey with double columns flanking the main door. In May 1819, Chantrell won the competition to design a new hall for the Leeds Philosophical Society, also in a classical design. He went on to design the South Market which included a Neo-classical temple. However, by 1825 he fell out of favour with prominent townsmen.

After a few years, Chantrell reinvented himself as a pioneering Gothic specialist to meet the huge demand of the times for additional church accommodation. He became one of the most accomplished specialists in this area of practice and numerous remaining buildings testify his original skills. The crowning of his career was the building of Leeds Parish Church (1837–1841), the biggest church in England since Christopher Wren's St Paul's and, on a national level, the most important church of the age.

After he moved to London, Chantrell started a second career as surveyor of church constructions. He also became a respected antiquary, writer, lecturer and member of several prestigious London committees.

Architectural work
Surviving buildings by Chantrell include:
alterations to the Leeds Library, including galleries (1821–36)
completion of Rudding Park House (c.1824)
alterations to St Mary-the-Virgin, Hunslet (1826)
St Stephen's Church, Kirkstall (1828–9)
Emmanuel Church, Lockwood (1828–29)
All Saints, Netherthong (1828–9)
St Peter, Morley (1829–30)
St Matthew, Holbeck (1829–32)
partial reconstruction of All Saints, Pontefract (1832–33)
St Peter-at-Leeds or Leeds Parish Church (now Leeds Minster) (1837–41)
Christ Church, Skipton (1837–39)
Christ Church, Lothersdale (1838)
St Wilfred, Pool-in-Wharfedale (1839)
the steeple of Holy Trinity, Boar Lane, Leeds (1839)
the neo-roman tower of the St. Salvator's Cathedral in Bruges, (Belgium) (1839)
the neo-Norman bellcote of St John the Baptist, Adel (1839)
St David, Holmbridge (1839–40)
St Lucius, Farnley Tyas (1840)
Holy Trinity, Batley Carr (1841–42)
St Paul, Shadwell (1841–42)
St Mary, Honley (1843)
Holy Trinity, Leven (1843)
St Paul, Denholme Gate (1843–46, with Thomas Shaw)
All Saints, Roberttown (1844–46, with Thomas Shaw)
Holy Trinity, Cowling (1845)
St Mary the Virgin's Church, Middleton, Leeds (1846–52)
the tower of St Paul, Halifax (1847)
St Andrew, Keighley (1847–48)
St Paul, Armitage Bridge (1848)
St George's, New Mills (1829–30)

Surviving buildings restored by Chantrell include:
St Catherine, Barmby Moor, East Yorkshire (1852)

Gallery

Sources and literature 

 Howard COLVIN,  Biographical Dictionary of English Architects 1660–1840, John Murray, London, 1954
 Nikolaus PEVSNER & Enid RADCLIFFE Yorkshire: The West Riding, 1959, 2nd edition 1967, Penguin Books, London
 Derek LINSTRUM,  West Yorkshire Architects and Architecture, Lund Humphries Publishers, London, 1979,  
 Andries VAN DEN ABEELE & Christopher WEBSTER, Architect Robert D. Chantrell en de kathedraal van Brugge, 1987, Bruges
 Christopher WEBSTER, R.D. Chantrell, architect: his life and work in Leeds 1818–1847, Leeds, 1992
 Christopher WEBSTER & Andries VAN DEN ABEELE, A portentous mass of bastard romanesque frippery: an early ecclesiological export, Leeds, 1999.
Susan WRATHMELL,  & John MINNIS, Leeds, Pevsner Architectural Guides, Yale University Press, New Haven, CT, 2005,  
 Christopher WEBSTER, R. D. Chantrell (1793–1872) and the architecture of a lost generation, Reading, Spire Books, 2010, .

References

19th-century English architects
People from Newington, London
Architects from London
1793 births
1872 deaths